Stanley Armour Dunham (March 23, 1918February 8, 1992) was the maternal grandfather of Barack Obama, the 44th president of the United States. He and his wife Madelyn Payne Dunham raised Obama from the age of 10 in Honolulu, Hawaii.

Early life and education
Dunham was born in Wichita, Kansas, the younger of two sons to Ralph Waldo Emerson Dunham, Sr. (December 25, 1894, Sumner County, Kansas – October 4, 1970, Wichita, Kansas) and Ruth Lucille Armour (September 1, 1900, Illinois – November 25, 1926, Wichita, Kansas). His father's ancestors settled in Kempton, Indiana, in the 1840s, before relocating to Kansas. His parents were married on October 3, 1915, at a home on South Saint Francis St. in Wichita, and opened The Travelers' Cafe on William Street situated between the old firehouse and the old Wichita City Hotel.

On November 25, 1926, at age 8, Dunham discovered his mother's body after she had committed suicide. Subsequently, Dunham's father placed him and his older brother Ralph Waldo Emerson Dunham, Jr. in the care of their maternal grandparents in El Dorado, Kansas. A rebellious teenager, Dunham allegedly punched his high school principal and spent some time drifting, hopping rail cars to Chicago, California, and back again. He married Madelyn Lee Payne on May 5, 1940, the night of her senior prom.

Later life

World War II
Dunham enlisted as a private in the U.S. Army on January 18, 1942, at Fort Leavenworth, Kansas, and served in the European Theatre of World War II with the 1830th Ordnance Supply and Maintenance Company, Aviation. During D-Day, this unit helped to support the 9th Air Force. Dunham and his brother were deployed to France six weeks after D-Day. Before the Invasion of Normandy, the brothers once met accidentally as Stanley Dunham went in search of rations at a hotel in London, where his brother Ralph Dunham happened to be staying. Madelyn Dunham gave birth to their daughter Stanley Ann Dunham, who was later known as Ann, at St. Francis Hospital in Wichita on November 29, 1942. During the war, Madelyn Dunham worked on a Boeing B-29 assembly line in Wichita.

Post-World War II
After two years of military service in Europe (1943–1945), Dunham was discharged from the U.S. Army on August 30, 1945. After the war, the family moved to Berkeley, California, so he could pursue study at the University of California, Berkeley and then eventually back to El Dorado, Kansas, where Dunham managed a furniture store. In 1955, after the Dunhams moved to Seattle, Washington, Dunham worked as a salesman for the Standard-Grunbaum Furniture Company, and his daughter Ann attended middle school. The family lived in an apartment in the Wedgwood Estates in the Wedgwood, Seattle neighborhood. In 1956 they moved to the Shorewood Apartments on Mercer Island, a Seattle suburb. Ann attended high school there, and they stayed until she graduated in 1960. In 1957, Dunham started working for the Doces Majestic Furniture Company.

Hawaii
The family then moved to Honolulu, Hawaii, where Dunham found a better furniture store opportunity. Madelyn Dunham started working at the Bank of Hawaii in 1960, and was promoted as one of the bank's first female vice presidents in 1970.

In Barack Obama's memoir, Dreams From My Father, he wrote, "One of my earliest memories is of sitting on my grandfather's shoulders as the astronauts from one of the Apollo missions arrived at Hickam Air Force Base after a successful splashdown". At 10 years old, Barack Obama moved in with the Dunhams in Honolulu to attend school in the U.S. while his mother and stepfather Lolo Soetoro were living in Jakarta, Indonesia. His mother later came back to Hawaii to pursue graduate studies, but when she returned to Indonesia in 1977 for her master's fieldwork, Obama stayed in the United States with his grandparents. Obama wrote in his memoir, Dreams From My Father, "I'd arrived at an unspoken pact with my grandparents: I could live with them and they'd leave me alone so long as I kept my trouble out of sight".

Death
Dunham died in Honolulu, Hawaii, on February 8, 1992, and is interred in the Punchbowl National Cemetery.

Ancestry
Dunham is a direct descendant of Jonathan Singletary Dunham, a prominent early American settler who left the Plymouth Colony to build the first gristmill in New Jersey.

The most recent native European ancestor was Falmouth Kearney, a farmer who emigrated from Moneygall, County Offaly, Ireland, during the Great Irish Famine and settled in Jefferson Township, Tipton County, Indiana, United States. Kearney's youngest daughter, Mary Ann (Kearney) Dunham, was Stanley Dunham's paternal grandmother.

Stanley Dunham's distant cousins include six U.S. presidents - and another president who is Dunham's grandson: James Madison, Harry Truman, Lyndon Johnson, Jimmy Carter, George H. W. Bush and George W. Bush, plus Barack Obama, his grandson.  Through a common ancestor, Mareen Duvall, a wealthy Huguenot merchant who emigrated to Maryland in the 1650s, Dunham is related to former Vice-President Dick Cheney (an eighth cousin once removed). Through Duvall and another common ancestor, Hans Gutknecht, a German Swiss from Bischwiller, Alsace whose three sons resettled in Germantown, Pennsylvania, as well as the Kentucky frontier in the mid-18th century, Dunham is President Harry S. Truman's fourth cousin, twice removed.  Dunham and Wild Bill Hickok are sixth cousins, four times removed, through Jacob Dunham.

References

External links

 "Family precedent: Obama's grandmother blazed trails'" USA Today, April 8, 2008
 "Remembering Madelyn Dunham" Honolulu Advertiser, November 15, 2008, includes photo gallery and memorial service video

1918 births
1992 deaths
People from Wichita, Kansas
United States Army personnel of World War II
American people of Irish descent
American people of English descent
Obama family
People from El Dorado, Kansas
People from Honolulu
Burials in the National Memorial Cemetery of the Pacific
United States Army non-commissioned officers